Polk Township is a rural township in Dade County, in the U.S. state of Missouri. It is laid out as a north-south rectangle just east of Pleasant Hill, Missouri and incorporates the small town of Strasburg, Missouri and the location of the former village of Wingate, along with much open farmland.

Polk Township has the name of James K. Polk, 11th President of the United States.

References

Townships in Missouri
Townships in Dade County, Missouri